Ihsan (also transliterated as Ehsan; Arabic, Persian and  or) is an Arabic masculine given name.

Given name
 Ihsan
 İhsan Oktay Anar (born 1960), Turkish writer
 İhsan Sabri Çağlayangil (1908–1993), Turkish politician
 Ihsan Danish (1914–1982), Urdu poet
 İhsan Doğramacı (1915–2010), Turkish academic
 İhsan Hakan (1965-1993), PKK defector
 İhsan Ketin (1914–1995), Turkish earth scientist
 Ihsan Maulana Mustofa (born 1995), Indonesian badminton player
 Ihsan H. Nadiem (born 1940), Pakistani archaeologist, museologist, author and poet
 Ihsan Nuri (c. 1893–1976), Kurdish soldier and politician
 İhsan Burak Özsaraç (born 1979), Turkish footballer
 Ihsan Poyraz (born 1988), Austrian footballer
 Ihsan Abdel Quddous (1919–1990), Egyptian writer, novelist, and journalist
 İhsan Sabancı (1931–1979), Turkish businessman
 İhsan Saraçlar (1928–2008), Turkish lawyer and politician
 Ihsan Ali Al-Shehbaz (born 1939), Iraqi American botanist
 İhsan Emre Vural (born 1984), Turkish rower
 İhsan Yüce (1930-1991), Turkish actor

 Ehsan
 Ehsan Aman (born 1959), Afghan singer
 Ehsan Haddadi (born 1985), Iranian discus thrower
 Ehsan Hajysafi (born 1990), Iranian footballer
 Ehsan ul Haq (born 1949), Pakistani general
 Ehsan Jami (born 1985), Dutch politician
 Ehsan Khandozi (born 1980), Iranian economist and politician
 Ehsan Naghibazadeh (born 1990), Iranian Taekwondo practitioner
 Ehsan Yarshater (1920–2018), Iranian historian
 Ehsan Elahi Zaheer (1945–1987), Muslim scholar

 Mid name
 Hafiz Ihsan Saeed (born 1978), Pakistani Guantanamo detainee

See also
 Ihsan, Arabic term meaning benefaction

Arabic masculine given names
Iranian masculine given names
Turkish masculine given names

de:İhsan